Trimmed is a 1922 American silent Western film directed by Harry A. Pollard and featuring Hoot Gibson. It is not known whether the film currently survives, and it may be a lost film.

Cast
 Hoot Gibson as Dale Garland
 Patsy Ruth Miller as Alice Millard
 Alfred Hollingsworth as John Millard
 Fred Kohler as Young Bill Young
 Otto Hoffman as Nebo Slayter
 Dick La Reno as Judge William Dandridge

See also
 Hoot Gibson filmography

References

External links

 

1922 films
1922 Western (genre) films
American black-and-white films
Films directed by Harry A. Pollard
Silent American Western (genre) films
Universal Pictures films
1920s American films